Lara or Lára (Greek:Λάρα) is a mountain in Ineia in the Paphos District of Cyprus. Is located at 669 m above sea level. The terrain around Lára is mainly hilly. The nearest larger community is Empa, 17.7 km south of Lára. It receives 631 mm of rainfall annually.

References 

Mountains of Cyprus